A Somewhat Gentle Man ( and also known as Regnskap) is a 2010 Norwegian crime comedy film directed by Hans Petter Moland. It premiered on 19 March 2010, and was the sixth feature-film directed by Hans Petter Moland. It was nominated for the Golden Bear at the 60th Berlin International Film Festival.

Morland said that the film "A Somewhat Gentle Man is about grown-ups struggling to keep up with the times. It's a black comedy about burning out with dignity, even for criminals".

During opening weekend in Norway, 16,000 people saw A Somewhat Gentle Man in theaters. The film received the Norwegian 'Film Critic Award' in 2011.

Cast
 Stellan Skarsgård as Ulrik
 Bjørn Floberg as Rune Jensen
 Gard B. Eidsvold as Rolf
 Jorunn Kjellsby as Karen Margrethe
 Bjørn Sundquist as Sven
 Jon Øigarden as Kristian
 Kjersti Holmen as Wenche
 Jan Gunnar Røise as Geir
 Julia Bache-Wiig as Silje
 Aksel Hennie as Samí
 Henrik Mestad as Kenny
 Jannike Kruse as Merete
 Ane H. Røvik Wahlen as Kenny's wife

References

External links
 

2010 films
2010 comedy-drama films
2010s crime comedy-drama films
Norwegian crime comedy films
Norwegian comedy-drama films
2010s Norwegian-language films
Films directed by Hans Petter Moland